This list of Academy Award records is current as of the 95th Academy Awards, with the ceremony taking place in March 2023.

Most awards or nominations  

 Most awards won by a single film: 11
 Three films have won 11 Academy Awards:
 Ben-Hur (1959): nominated in 12 of the 15 possible categories
 Titanic (1997): nominated in 14 of the 17 possible categories
 The Lord of the Rings: The Return of the King (2003): nominated in 11 of the 17 possible categories
 Most nominations received by a single film: 14
 Three films have received 14 nominations:
All About Eve (1950): won 6 awards out of 16 possible categories
 Titanic (1997): won 11 awards out of 17 possible categories
 La La Land (2016): won 6 awards out of 17 possible categories
 Largest sweep (winning awards in every nominated category): 11
 The Lord of the Rings: The Return of the King (2003) won in every category for which it was nominated: Best Picture, Director, Adapted Screenplay, Art Direction, Makeup, Costume Design, Film Editing, Original Score, Original Song, Sound Mixing, and Visual Effects
 Most total awards won by a person: 22
 Walt Disney
 Alan Menken and Dennis Muren hold the record for the most awards by a living person: 8 apiece
 Most total awards won by a woman: 8
 Edith Head, all for Costume Design
 Most total nominations for a person: 59
 Walt Disney
 Most nominations & awards for a person in a single year: 6 & 4
 In 1954, Walt Disney received six nominations and won four awards, both records. He won Best Documentary, Features for The Living Desert; Best Documentary, Short Subjects for The Alaskan Eskimo; Best Short Subject, Cartoons for Toot, Whistle, Plunk and Boom; and Best Short Subject, Two-reel for Bear Country. He had two additional nominations in Best Short Subject, Cartoons for Rugged Bear; and Best Short Subject, Two-reel for Ben and Me
Most competitive awards won by a person who is still living: 8
 Composer Alan Menken has won 8 competitive awards
 Of note: Visual Effects Supervisor Dennis Muren has won 9 Academy Awards: six competitive awards, two "Special Achievement" awards, and one "Technical Achievement" award

Acting: 4
Katharine Hepburn, all for Best Actress
Directing: 4
John Ford
Writing: 3
Woody Allen, all for Best Original Screenplay
Charles Brackett, for both Best Adapted and Original Screenplay
Paddy Chayefsky, for both Best Adapted and Original Screenplay
Francis Ford Coppola, for both Best Adapted and Original Screenplay
Billy Wilder, for both Best Adapted and Original Screenplay
Film Editing: 3
Michael Kahn
Thelma Schoonmaker
Daniel Mandell
Ralph Dawson
Cinematography: 4
Joseph Ruttenberg
Leon Shamroy
Film Music Composition and Songwriting: 9
Alfred Newman, all for Best Original Score
Of note:
Alan Menken won eight awards in musical categories
John Williams won five awards, holds the record for the most nominations by a living person at 53.
Sammy Cahn won four awards, all for Best Original Song
Johnny Mercer won four awards, all for Best Original Song
Jimmy Van Heusen won four awards, all for Best Original Song
Art Direction: 11
Cedric Gibbons, who designed the Oscar statuette, received 38 nominations
Costume Design: 8
Edith Head, who received 35 nominations in total
Makeup: 7
Rick Baker, who has received 11 nominations in total
Visual Effects: 8
Dennis Muren, who has received 15 nominations in total
Special Effects (discontinued in 1962): 3
A. Arnold Gillespie, who received 12 nominations in total
 Most awards won for an animated feature film: 3
 Pete Docter, who has received 4 nominations in total
 Most nominations received for an animated feature film: 4
 Pete Docter, who has received four nominations for the Best Animated Feature, winning 3
Most awards won by a country for Best International Feature Film: 14
Italy, which has received 32 nominations in total
Most nominations received by a country for Best International Feature Film: 40
France, which has won the award 12 times
Most nominations received by a country for Best International Feature Film without an award: 10
Israel
Most awards won by a foreign-language film: 4
 Four foreign-language films have won four Academy Awards:
Fanny and Alexander (1982) won Best Foreign Language Film, Best Art Direction, Best Cinematography, and Best Costume Design
Crouching Tiger, Hidden Dragon (2000) won Best Foreign Language Film, Best Art Direction, Best Cinematography, and Best Original Score
Parasite (2019) won Best International Feature Film, Best Picture, Best Director, and Best Original Screenplay
All Quiet on the Western Front (2022) won Best International Feature Film, Best Production Design, Best Cinematography, and Best Original Score
Most nominations received by a foreign-language film: 10
 Two foreign language films have been nominated for ten Academy Awards:
Crouching Tiger, Hidden Dragon (2000): Best Foreign Language Film (*), Best Picture, Best Director, Best Adapted Screenplay, Best Art Direction (*), Best Cinematography (*), Best Costume Design, Best Film Editing, Best Original Score (*), and Best Original Song
Roma (2018): Best Foreign Language Film (*), Best Picture, Best Director (*), Best Original Screenplay, Best Actress, Best Supporting Actress, Best Art Direction, Best Cinematography (*), Best Sound Editing, and Best Sound Mixing

Awards for debut acting or directing performances on film

These people won Academy Awards for their debut performances in film:

 Best Actor
 None
 Best Actress
 Shirley Booth (Come Back, Little Sheba, 1952)
 Julie Andrews (Mary Poppins, 1964)
 Barbra Streisand (Funny Girl, 1968)
 Marlee Matlin (Children of a Lesser God, 1986)
 Best Supporting Actor
 Harold Russell (The Best Years of Our Lives, 1946)
 Timothy Hutton (Ordinary People, 1980)
 Haing S. Ngor (The Killing Fields, 1984)
 Best Supporting Actress
 Gale Sondergaard (Anthony Adverse, 1936)
 Katina Paxinou (For Whom the Bell Tolls, 1943)
 Mercedes McCambridge (All the King's Men, 1949)
 Eva Marie Saint (On the Waterfront, 1954)
 Jo Van Fleet (East of Eden, 1955)
 Tatum O'Neal (Paper Moon, 1973)
 Anna Paquin (The Piano, 1993)
 Jennifer Hudson (Dreamgirls, 2006)
 Lupita Nyong'o (12 Years a Slave, 2013)
 Honorary Award
 Harold Russell (The Best Years of Our Lives, 1946)
 Academy Juvenile Award
 Claude Jarman Jr. (The Yearling, 1946)
 Vincent Winter (The Little Kidnappers, 1954)

These people won Academy Awards for their film debut direction:

 Best Director
 Delbert Mann (Marty, 1955)
 Jerome Robbins (West Side Story, 1961)
 Robert Redford (Ordinary People, 1980)
 James L. Brooks (Terms of Endearment, 1983)
 Kevin Costner (Dances with Wolves, 1990)
 Sam Mendes (American Beauty, 1999)

Big Five winners 

Three films have received the Big Five Academy Awards: Best Picture, Director, Actor, Actress, and Screenplay (Original or Adapted; all won for Best Adapted Screenplay).

 It Happened One Night (1934)
 One Flew Over the Cuckoo's Nest (1975)
 The Silence of the Lambs (1991)

Most consecutive awards
 Any awards
 Walt Disney received record 10 awards in the eight consecutive years from 1931/32 through 1939. Eight (listed below) are for Short Subject (Cartoon), and two were Special Awards: one for the creation of Mickey Mouse, and one recognizing the innovation of Snow White and the Seven Dwarfs.
 Best Picture
 David O. Selznick produced two consecutive Best Picture winners Gone with the Wind in 1939 and Rebecca in 1940 (He himself was not awarded the Oscars as at the time the statuette went to the studio instead of the producer)
 Best Director
 Three directors have won two consecutive awards (of which, one of each of their movies won the Academy Award for Best Picture and one did not): 
 John Ford – The Grapes of Wrath (1940) and How Green Was My Valley (1941)
 Joseph L. Mankiewicz – A Letter to Three Wives (1949) and All About Eve (1950)
 Alejandro G. Iñárritu – Birdman or (The Unexpected Virtue of Ignorance) (2014) and The Revenant (2015)
 Best Actor
 Two actors have won two consecutive awards:
 Spencer Tracy – Captains Courageous (1937) and Boys Town (1938)
 Tom Hanks – Philadelphia (1993) and Forrest Gump (1994)
 Best Actress
 Two actresses have won two consecutive awards:
 Luise Rainer – The Great Ziegfeld (1936) and The Good Earth (1937)
 Katharine Hepburn – Guess Who's Coming to Dinner (1967) and The Lion in Winter (1968)
 Best Supporting Actor
 Jason Robards won two consecutive awards for All the President's Men in 1976 and Julia in 1977
 Best Supporting Actress
 No consecutive winner for Best Supporting Actress
 Best Adapted Screenplay
 Two screenwriters have won two consecutive awards:
 Joseph L. Mankiewicz – A Letter to Three Wives (1949) and All About Eve (1950)
 Robert Bolt – Doctor Zhivago (1965) and A Man for All Seasons (1966)
 Best Original Screenplay
 No consecutive winner for Best Original Screenplay
 Best Art Direction
Thomas Little won four consecutive awards for Best Art Direction. He won Best Art Direction, Black and White, for the films How Green Was My Valley in 1941, This Above All in 1942, and The Song of Bernadette in 1943, and then he won an Oscar the next year in 1944 for Best Art Direction, Color for the film Wilson
 Best Cinematography
 Emmanuel Lubezki won three consecutive awards for Gravity in 2013, Birdman or (The Unexpected Virtue of Ignorance) in 2014 and The Revenant in 2015
 Best Costume Design
 Of Edith Head's eight awards won for Best Costume Design, three were won in consecutive years: in 1949 for The Heiress, in 1950 for All About Eve, and in 1951 for A Place in the Sun for Best Costume Design, Black-and-White; in 1950 she also won for Samson and Delilah for Best Costume Design, Color
 Best Film Editing
 Angus Wall and Kirk Baxter won for The Social Network in 2010, and The Girl with the Dragon Tattoo in 2011
 Best Original Score
 Roger Edens won three consecutive awards for composing the scores for Easter Parade (1948), On the Town (1949), and Annie Get Your Gun (1950)
 Alfred Newman won two consecutive awards in Best Scoring of a Musical Picture for With a Song in My Heart (1952), and Call Me Madam (1953).
 Alan Menken won two consecutive awards for composing the scores for Beauty and the Beast (1991) and Aladdin (1992)
 Gustavo Santaolalla won two consecutive awards for composing the scores for Brokeback Mountain (2005) and Babel (2006)
 Best Original Song
 Three composers have won two consecutive awards for best original song, but under different award names:
 Henry Mancini (music) and Johnny Mercer (lyrics) shared the awards in Best Music (Song) for "Moon River" from Breakfast at Tiffany's in 1961, and "Days of Wine and Roses" from Days of Wine and Roses in 1962
 Alan Menken (music) won twice consecutively in Best Music (Original Song) for "Beauty and the Beast" from Beauty and the Beast (lyrics by Howard Ashman) in 1991, and "A Whole New World" from Aladdin (lyrics by Tim Rice) in 1992
 Best Sound Mixing
 Thomas Moulton won three consecutive awards for The Snake Pit in 1948, Twelve O'Clock High in 1949, and All About Eve in 1950
 Best Visual Effects
 Glen Robinson won four consecutive non-competitive wins Earthquake in 1974, The Hindenburg in 1975, and both King Kong and Logan's Run in 1976
 Of Dennis Muren's eight Academy Awards for Best Visual Effects, three of them were consecutive wins (under different names); E.T. The Extra Terrestrial in 1982, Return of the Jedi in 1983, and Indiana Jones and the Temple of Doom in 1984.
 Jim Rygiel and Randall William Cook won three consecutive visual effects Oscars for The Lord of the Rings: The Fellowship of the Ring (2001), The Lord of the Rings: The Two Towers (2002), and The Lord of the Rings: The Return of the King (2003)
 Best Documentary (Feature)
 Walt Disney won two consecutive awards for The Living Desert in 1953 and The Vanishing Prairie in 1954
 Best Short Subject (Cartoon)
 Of Walt Disney's many awards for Best Animated Short, eight of these wins were in consecutive years, for Flowers and Trees in 1931/32, Three Little Pigs in 1932/33, The Tortoise and the Hare in 1934, Three Orphan Kittens in 1935, The Country Cousin in 1936, The Old Mill in 1937, Ferdinand the Bull in 1938, and The Ugly Duckling in 1939
 Best Short Subject (Two-Reel)
 Of Walt Disney's multiple awards for Best Live Action Short, four of his wins were in consecutive years, in 1950 for In Beaver Valley, in 1951 for Nature's Half Acre, in 1952 for Water Birds, and in 1953 for Bear Country

Academy Award firsts
 First Best Picture winning film 
 Wings (1927)
 First Best Picture winning sound film 
 The Broadway Melody (1929)
 First person born in the 20th century to win and be nominated for an Academy Award
 Janet Gaynor, for Best Actress, 7th Heaven, Street Angel, Sunrise (1928)
First person born in the 21st century to win an Academy Award
Billie Eilish, for Best Original Song, "No Time to Die" from No Time to Die (2021)
First person born in the 21st century to be nominated for an Academy Award
 Quvenzhané Wallis, for Best Actress, Beasts of the Southern Wild (2012)
First Asian person to win Best Picture
 Bong Joon-ho and Kwak Sin-ae (both from South Korea) for Parasite (2019)
First Asian person to be nominated for Best Picture
 Ismail Merchant (from India) for A Room with a View (1986)
First Asian director (and non-Caucasian director) to win Best Director
 Ang Lee (from Taiwan) for Brokeback Mountain (2005)
First Asian person (and non-Caucasian) to be nominated for Best Director
 Hiroshi Teshigahara (from Japan) for Woman in the Dunes (1965)
First Asian person (and non-Caucasian person) to receive each of the Honorary Awards
 Akira Kurosawa (from Japan) received an Honorary Award in 1989
First Black person (and non-Caucasian person) to win Best Picture
 Steve McQueen for 12 Years a Slave (2013)
First Black person (and non-Caucasian person) to be nominated for Best Picture
 Quincy Jones for The Color Purple (1985)
First Black director to be nominated for Best Director
 John Singleton for Boyz n the Hood (1991)
First woman to win and be nominated for Best Picture
 Julia Phillips for The Sting (1973)
First woman to win and be nominated for Best Documentary
 Nancy Hamilton for Helen Keller in Her Story (1955). Hamilton both produced and directed. Janice Loeb was nominated in 1948 as producer of The Quiet One but she did not direct it
First woman to win Best Director
 Kathryn Bigelow for The Hurt Locker (2009)
First woman of color to win and be nominated for Best Director
 Chloé Zhao for Nomadland (2020)
First woman to be nominated for Best Director
 Lina Wertmüller for Seven Beauties (1976)
 First woman to be nominated twice for Best Director
 Jane Campion for The Piano (1993) and The Power of the Dog (2021)
 First woman to win Best Animated Feature
 Brenda Chapman for Brave (2012)
First woman to be nominated for Best Animated Feature
 Marjane Satrapi for Persepolis (2007)
First woman to win Best Original Score
 Rachel Portman for Emma (1996)
First woman to receive each of the Honorary Awards
 6-year old Shirley Temple received an Academy Juvenile Award in 1934
 Greta Garbo received an Honorary Award in 1954
 Martha Raye received a Jean Hersholt Humanitarian Award in 1969
 Kay Rose received a Special Achievement Academy Award for Sound Effects Editing of The River in 1985
 Kathleen Kennedy received an Irving G. Thalberg Memorial Award in 2018
First foreign-language film to win Best Picture
 Parasite (2019), in Korean
First foreign-language film to be nominated for Best Picture
 La Grande Illusion (1937), in French
All foreign-language films to be nominated for Best Picture

{| cellpadding=2 cellspacing=0 border=1 style="border-collapse:collapse; border: 1px #555 solid; text-align:center" class="sortable"
|- bgcolor="#bebebe"
! width="5%" | Year
! width="18%" | Film title used in nomination
! width="18%" | Original title
! width="18%" | Award recipient(s)
! width="18%" | Country of production
! width="18%" | Language(s)
! width="5%" class="unsortable" | Notes
|- bgcolor="#ececec"
| 1937(11th)
| La Grande Illusion
| La Grande Illusion
| Réalisation d'art cinématographique(production company)
| align="left" |  France
| French(some parts in German, English & Russian)
| 
|- bgcolor="#ececec"
| 1969(42nd)
| Z
| Z
| 
| align="left" |  France Algeria
| French
| 
|- bgcolor="#ececec"
| 1971(45th)
| 
| Utvandrarna
| 
| align="left" |  Sweden
| Swedish
| 
|- bgcolor="#ececec"
| 1972(46th)
| Cries and Whispers
| Viskningar och rop
| 
| align="left" |  Sweden
| Swedish
| 
|- bgcolor="#ececec"
| 1994(68th)
| 
| Il postino
| 
| align="left" |  Italy
| Italian(some parts in Spanish)
| 
|- bgcolor="#ececec"
| 1997(71st)
| Life Is Beautiful
| La vita è bella
| 
| align="left" |  Italy
| Italian(some parts in German & English)
| 
|- bgcolor="#ececec"
| 2000(73rd)
| Crouching Tiger, Hidden Dragon
| Wòhǔ Cánglóng(pinyin)臥虎藏龍(traditional Chinese)卧虎藏龙(simplified Chinese)
| 
| align="left" |  Taiwan China Hong Kong United States
| Mandarin
| 
|- bgcolor="#ececec"
| 2006(79th)
| Letters from Iwo Jima
| Letters from Iwo Jima(English)Iô-Jima kara no tegami硫黄島からの手紙(Japanese)
| 
| align="left" |  United States
| Japanese(some parts in English)
| 
|- bgcolor="#ececec"
| 2006(79th)
| Babel
| Babel
| Jon Kilik
| align="left" |  United States Mexico France
| English, Arabic, Spanish, Japanese, Japanese Sign language, Berber languages
|
|- bgcolor="#ececec"
| 2012(85th)
| Amour
| Amour
| Margaret MenegozStefan ArndtVeit HeiduschkaMichael Katz
| align="left" |  Austria France Germany
| French
| 
|- bgcolor="#ececec"
| 2018(91st)
| Roma
| Roma
| Gabriela RodríguezAlfonso Cuarón
| align="left" |  Mexico
 United States
| Spanish, Mixtec
| 
|- bgcolor="#91CFF6"
| 2019(92nd)
| Parasite
|Gisaengchung기생충(Korean)|  Kwak Sin-aeBong Joon-ho| align="left" |  South Korea| Korean|
|- bgcolor="#ececec"
| 2020(93rd)
| Minari
| Minari(English)미나리(Korean)
| Christina Oh
| align="left" |  United States
| Korean(some parts in English)
|
|-
|- bgcolor="#ececec"
| 2021(94th)
|Drive My Car
| ドライブ・マイ・カー
Doraibu mai kā(Japanese)
| Teruhisa Yamamoto
| align="left" |  Japan
| Japanese(some parts in other European languages)
|
|-
|- bgcolor="#ececec"
| 2022(95th)
|All Quiet on the Western Front
| Im Westen nichts Neues
| Malte Grunert
| align="left" |  Germany
| German(some parts in French)
|
|}First film by genre to win Best Picture Drama: Grand Hotel (1932)
 Comedy: It Happened One Night (1934)
 War, Epic: Wings (1927)
 Biopic: The Great Ziegfeld (1936)
 Historical: Mutiny on the Bounty (1935)
 Adventure: The Greatest Show on Earth (1952)
 Musical: The Broadway Melody (1929)
 Crime/Mystery, Thriller: In the Heat of the Night (1967)
 Horror: The Silence of the Lambs (1991)
 Fantasy: The Lord of the Rings: The Return of the King (2003)
 Western: Cimarron (1931)
 Science-fiction: Everything Everywhere All at Once (2022)
 Disaster: Titanic (1997)First superhero film to be nominated for Best Picture Black Panther (2018)First X-rated film to win and be nominated for Best Picture Midnight Cowboy (1969)First film with an entirely non-white cast to win Best Picture Slumdog Millionaire (2008)First film with an all-Black cast to win Best Picture Moonlight (2016)First 3-D film to be nominated for Best Picture Avatar and Up (2009)First streaming service film to be nominated Best PictureManchester by the Sea (2016), distributed by Amazon StudiosFirst streaming service film to win Best PictureCODA (2021), distributed by Apple TV+ Original FilmsFirst animated film to be nominated for Best Picture Beauty and the Beast (1991)Only animated films to be nominated for Best Picture Beauty and the Beast (1991), Up (2009) and Toy Story 3 (2010)First highest-grossing film of all time to win and be nominated for Best Picture Gone with the Wind (1939)First highest-grossing film of all time to not be nominated for Best Picture Jurassic Park (1993)First highest-grossing film of all time to not win an Academy Award Avengers: Endgame (2019)First film to receive the most nominations of its year without receiving a Best Picture nomination Dreamgirls (2006), with eight nominationsFirst adult animated films to be nominated in any categories South Park: Bigger, Longer & Uncut (1999) is rated R by the MPAA, the first R-rated to be nominated for Best Original Song
 The Triplets of Belleville (2003) is rated PG-13 by the MPAA, the first PG-13 rated to be nominated for Best Animated Feature and Original Song
 Waltz with Bashir (2008) is rated R by the MPAA, the first to be nominated for Best International Feature Film, representing Israel
 Anomalisa (2015) is rated R by the MPAA, the first R-rated to be nominated for Best Animated Feature
 Isle of Dogs (2018) is rated PG-13 by the MPAA, the first PG-13 rated to be nominated for Best Original Score
 Flee (2021) is rated PG-13 by MPA, the first PG-13 rated to be nominated for Best Documentary Feature and International Feature Film, representing DenmarkFirst adult animated film to be nominated more than twice Flee (2021) with three nominationsFirst animated film to be nominated for any Screenplay award, specifically Best Original Screenplay Toy Story (1995)First animated film to win Best Animated Feature and nominated for Best Adapted Screenplay Shrek (2001)First animated film to win both music categories Pinocchio (1940) for Best Original Score and SongFirst animated film to win technical category, specifically Best Sound Editing until was merged into Best Sound at 93rd Academy Awards The Incredibles (2004)First animated film to be nominated for technical category, even Best Visual Effects The Nightmare Before Christmas (1993)First non-computer animated films to win Best Animated Feature Spirited Away is the first and only Japanese hand-drawn and non-English-language animated film.
 Wallace & Gromit: The Curse of the Were-Rabbit is the first stop motion animated filmFirst animated film to be nominated for Best Documentary Feature Flee (2021)First actor or actress to receive ten nominations for acting Bette Davis received her tenth official nomination (all for Best Actress) for the film What Ever Happened to Baby Jane? (1962)First actor to receive ten nominations for acting Laurence Olivier received his tenth nomination (for Best Actor or Best Supporting Actor) for the film The Boys from Brazil (1978)First actor or actress to receive twenty nominations for acting Meryl Streep received her twentieth nomination (for Best Actress or Best Supporting Actress) for the film Florence Foster Jenkins (2016)First film to win both an Academy Award and Golden Raspberry Award Wall Street (1987), Michael Douglas won an Academy Award for Best Actor and Daryl Hannah won a Golden Raspberry Award for Worst Supporting ActressFirst actor to be nominated for both an Academy Award and Golden Raspberry Award for the same performance in the filmJames Coco was nominated for both Best Supporting Actor and Worst Supporting Actor for Only When I Laugh (1981)First actress to be nominated for both an Academy Award and Golden Raspberry Award for the same performance in the filmAmy Irving was nominated for both Best Supporting Actress and Worst Supporting Actress for Yentl (1983)First person to be nominated for supporting acting and songwriting in the same year Mary J. Blige, nominated for Best Supporting Actress and Best Original Song ("Mighty River") for Mudbound (2017)First person to be nominated for lead acting and songwriting in the same year Lady Gaga, nominated for Best Actress and Best Original Song ("Shallow") for A Star Is Born (2018)First posthumous win for acting Peter Finch won Best Actor for Network (1976)First posthumous nomination for acting Jeanne Eagels, nominated for Best Actress for The Letter (1929)First posthumous nomination for an actor James Dean, nominated for Best Actor for East of Eden (1955)First posthumous nomination for a Black actor Chadwick Boseman, nominated for Best Actor for Ma Rainey's Black Bottom (2020)First actor or actress to win and be nominated for performing in a sign language Jane Wyman won Best Actress for Johnny Belinda (1948), performing in American Sign LanguageFirst actor or actress to win for performing in a language other than English Sophia Loren won Best Actress for Two Women (1961), performing in ItalianFirst actor or actress to be nominated for performing in a language other than English Melina Mercouri was nominated for Best Actress for Never on Sunday (1960), performing in GreekFirst actor to win for performing in a language other than English Robert De Niro won Best Supporting Actor for The Godfather Part II (1974), performing in ItalianFirst actor to be nominated for performing in a language other than English Marcello Mastroianni was nominated for Best Actor for Divorce Italian Style (1961), performing in ItalianFirst actor or actress to be nominated for a performance in a 3-D film Sandra Bullock was nominated for Best Actress for Gravity (2013)First actor to be nominated for a performance in a 3-D film Matt Damon was nominated for Best Actor for The Martian (2015)

 Acting firsts by ethnicity/nationalityFirst Canadian director to win Best Director James Cameron for Titanic (1997)First persons from India to win in any music category A. R. Rahman won Best Original Score and Best Original Song ("Jai Ho") for Slumdog Millionaire (2008)
 Gulzar also won Best Original Song ("Jai Ho") for Slumdog Millionaire (2008)First Middle Eastern movie to win Best International Feature FilmA Separation (2011), representing IranFirst foreign actress to be nominated twice for Best Actress for foreign-language films without the films receiving a Best International Feature Film nomination Marion Cotillard (from France) won Best Actress for La Vie en Rose (2007) and was nominated for Two Days, One Night (2014)First Black actress to win for film acting debut Jennifer Hudson won Best Supporting Actress for Dreamgirls (2006)First year in which two Black actors/actresses won for acting74th Academy Awards (in 2002, for 2001): Denzel Washington won Best Actor for Training Day; Halle Berry won Best Actress for Monster's BallFirst actress to win in any acting category and as a producer of the Best Picture in the same night Frances McDormand won Best Actress and Best Picture for Nomadland (2020)First Black writer to win for screenwriting Geoffrey S. Fletcher won Best Adapted Screenplay for Precious: Based on the Novel "Push" by Sapphire (2009)First African American to receive an Honorary Award James Baskett received a Special Award for his portrayal of Uncle Remus in Song of the South (1946)First Latin American to win Best DirectorAlfonso Cuarón (from Mexico) won for Gravity (2013)First child actor to receive an Academy Award nomination Jackie Cooper, age 9, was nominated for Best Actor for Skippy (1931)First short film to win an Academy Award outside of the Short Film categoriesThe Red Balloon (1956) for Best Original ScreenplayFirst professional athlete to win an Academy Award Kobe Bryant won Best Animated Short Film for Dear Basketball (2017)First deaf actor to win in an acting category Marlee Matlin for Best Actress in Children of a Lesser God (1986), performing in American Sign LanguageFirst deaf male actor to win in an acting categoryTroy Kotsur for Best Supporting Actor in CODA (2021), performing in American Sign LanguageFirst openly autistic actor to win an Academy AwardAnthony Hopkins for Best Actor in The Father (2020)
Note: Although he already won the same award for The Silence of the Lambs (1991), it wasn't until 2017 that he publicly revealed he has Asperger syndrome.First actor with dwarfism to win in an acting categoryLinda Hunt for Best Supporting Actress in The Year of Living Dangerously (1982)First actor with dwarfism to be nominated in an acting categoryMichael Dunn for Best Supporting Actor in Ship of Fools (1965)First actor to win for a portrayal of a character of the opposite genderLinda Hunt for Best Supporting Actress as Billy Kwan in The Year of Living Dangerously (1982)First portrayals of living persons to win in each acting categoryBest Actor: Gary Cooper as Sergeant Alvin York in Sergeant York (1941)
Best Actress: Sissy Spacek as Loretta Lynn in Coal Miner's Daughter (1980)
Best Supporting Actor: Jason Robards as Ben Bradlee in All the President's Men (1976)
Best Supporting Actress: Estelle Parsons as Blanche Barrow in Bonnie and Clyde (1967)
 Note: While Joanne Woodward's portrayal of Eve White in The Three Faces of Eve (1957) was based on a real person, Chris Costner Sizemore, her identity was not known until 1977.First hip hop song to win Best Original Song"Lose Yourself" by Eminem, which was used in film 8 Mile (2002)First woman of Filipino descent to win in any award"Fight For You" by H.E.R., which was used in film Judas and the Black Messiah (2021)First song from an Indian film to win Best Original Song"Naatu Naatu" from RRR (2022)

Age-related records
 Youngest winner of an acting award Tatum O'Neal, age 10 (for Best Supporting Actress, Paper Moon, 1973)
 Youngest nominee for an acting award Justin Henry, age 8 (for Best Supporting Actor, Kramer vs. Kramer, 1979)
 Youngest Best Actress winner Marlee Matlin, age 21 (Children of a Lesser God, 1986)
 Youngest Best Actress nominee Quvenzhané Wallis, age 9 (Beasts of the Southern Wild, 2012)Youngest Best Actor winner Adrien Brody, age 29 (The Pianist, 2002)
 Youngest Best Actor nominee Jackie Cooper, age 9 (Skippy, 1931)
 Youngest winner of an Oscar Shirley Temple, age 6, who was awarded the inaugural (now retired) non-competitive Academy Juvenile Award in 1934
 Youngest winner of an award for Best Original Screenplay Ben Affleck, age 25 (Good Will Hunting, 1997)
 Youngest Best Director winner Damien Chazelle, age 32 (La La Land, 2016)
 Youngest Best Director nominee John Singleton, age 24 (Boyz n the Hood, 1991)
 Oldest Best Director winner Clint Eastwood, age 74 (Million Dollar Baby, 2004)
 Oldest Best Director nominee John Huston, age 79 (Prizzi's Honor, 1985)
 Oldest winner of an acting award Anthony Hopkins, age 83 (Best Actor, The Father, 2020)Oldest nominee for an acting award Christopher Plummer, age 88 (Best Supporting Actor, All the Money in the World, 2017)
 Oldest Best Actress winner Jessica Tandy, age 80 (Driving Miss Daisy, 1989)
 Oldest Best Actress nominee Emmanuelle Riva, age 85 (Amour, 2012)
 Oldest Best Actor winner/nomineeAnthony Hopkins, age 83 (The Father, 2020)
 Oldest competitive Oscar winner James Ivory, age 89 (Best Adapted Screenplay, Call Me by Your Name, 2017)
 Ann Roth, age 89 (Best Costume Design, Ma Rainey's Black Bottom, 2020)
 Oldest competitive Oscar nominee John Williams, age 90 (Best Original Score, The Fabelmans, 2022)
 Oldest living Oscar nominee Glynis Johns, age 99 (Best Supporting Actress, The Sundowners, 1961)
 Earliest-born Oscar winner by birth year George Arliss, born 10 April 1868 (Best Actor, Disraeli, 1929)
 Earliest-born Oscar nominee by birth year May Robson, born 19 April 1858 (Best Actress, Lady for a Day, 1933)
 Year where all four Acting winners had the oldest age average 1981 with a combined average age of 70.5 years old.
 Henry Fonda (aged 77)
 Katharine Hepburn (72)
 John Gielgud (77)
 Maureen Stapleton (56) 
 Year where all four Acting winners had the youngest age average 1961 with a combined average age of just under 29 years old.
 Maximilian Schell (aged 31)
 Sophia Loren (27)
 George Chakiris (27)
 Rita Moreno (30)
 Youngest multiple nominees for an acting award (Best Actor or Best Supporting Actor) Youngest multiple nominees for an acting award (Best Actress or Best Supporting Actress)Film records
 Most Oscars without winning Best Picture Cabaret (1972) won 8 awards 
 Most nominations without winning Best Picture La La Land (2016) with 14 nominations
 Most nominations without any wins Two films received 11 nominations without winning any awards:
 The Turning Point (1977)
 The Color Purple (1985)
 Most nominations without a Best Picture nomination They Shoot Horses, Don't They? (1969) with 9 nominations
 Most Oscars without a nomination for Best Picture The Bad and the Beautiful (1952) with 5 wins
 Fewest awards and nominations for a Best Picture winner Grand Hotel (1932) received only the Best Picture nomination
 Nominations in the most different technical categoriesTitanic (1997) was nominated in all 10 technical categories (Cinematography, Costume Design, Film Editing, Production Design/Art Direction, Score, Song, Sound Editing, Sound Mixing, Visual Effects, and Makeup)
 Most nominations without a major nomination (Picture, Director, Acting and Screenplay) Pepe (1960) received 7 nominations with no major nominations
 These seven films got 6 nominations with no major nominations:
 The Rains Came (1939)
 Hans Christian Andersen (1952)
 It's a Mad, Mad, Mad, Mad World (1963)
 Empire of the Sun (1987)
 Who Framed Roger Rabbit (1988) (note: received 7 nominations when you include a "special achievement")
 Terminator 2: Judgment Day (1991)
Memoirs of a Geisha (2005)
 Best Picture nominees that won every nomination except Best Picture These 16 films were nominated for Best Picture and won in every category they were nominated for, except Best Picture:
 Bad Girl (1931), 2/3
 The Private Life of Henry VIII (1932), 1/2
 Naughty Marietta (1935), 1/2
 The Story of Louis Pasteur (1936), 3/4
 The Adventures of Robin Hood (1938), 3/4
 Miracle on 34th Street (1947), 3/4
 The Treasure of the Sierra Madre (1948), 3/4
 A Letter to Three Wives (1949), 2/3
 King Solomon's Mines (1950), 2/3
 Three Coins in the Fountain (1954), 2/3
 Jaws (1975), 3/4
 Traffic (2000), 4/5
 The Blind Side (2009), 1/2
 Selma (2014), 1/2
 Bohemian Rhapsody (2018), 4/5
 Women Talking (2022), 1/2
 Films nominated for Best Picture with no other major nominations These 32 films were nominated for Best Picture but had no other major nominations (this does not include films that were only nominated for Best Picture and nothing else):
 Wings (1927), 2 nominations (winner)
 42nd Street (1933), 2 nominations
 A Farewell to Arms (1933), 4 nominations
 Cleopatra (1934), 5 nominations
 Flirtation Walk (1934), 2 nominations
 The Gay Divorcee (1934), 5 nominations
 Imitation of Life (1934), 3 nominations
 The White Parade (1934), 2 nominations
 David Copperfield (1935), 3 nominations
 Les Misérables (1935), 4 nominations
 A Midsummer Night's Dream (1935), 4 nominations (note: actually had 2, but 2 more were write-in nominations)
 Naughty Marietta (1935), 2 nominations
 Top Hat (1935), 4 nominations
 A Tale of Two Cities (1936), 2 nominations
 The Adventures of Robin Hood (1938), 4 nominations
 Of Mice and Men (1939), 4 nominations
 The Wizard of Oz (1939), 6 nominations
 King Solomon's Mines (1950), 3 nominations
 Decision Before Dawn (1951), 2 nominations
 Ivanhoe (1952), 3 nominations
 Three Coins in the Fountain (1954), 3 nominations
 The Music Man (1962), 6 nominations
 Doctor Dolittle (1967), 9 nominations
 Hello, Dolly! (1969), 7 nominations
 Jaws (1975), 4 nominations
 Beauty and the Beast (1991), 6 nominations
 The Lord of the Rings: The Two Towers (2002), 6 nominations
 War Horse (2011), 6 nominations
 Selma (2014), 2 nominations
 Black Panther (2018), 7 nominations
 Ford v Ferrari (2019), 4 nominations
 Nightmare Alley (2021), 4 nominations
 Avatar: The Way of Water (2022), 4 nominations
 Stories made into multiple Best Picture nominees 9 sets of Best Picture nominees share either original source material or were revised versions of the same story (* = winner):
 Cleopatra (1934), Cleopatra (1963)
 Mutiny on the Bounty (1935)*, Mutiny on the Bounty (1962)
 Romeo and Juliet (1936), West Side Story (1961)*, Romeo and Juliet (1968), West Side Story (2021)
The plot of another Best Picture winner, Shakespeare in Love, revolves around the original production of Romeo and Juliet
 Les Misérables (1935), Les Misérables (2012)
 Pygmalion (1938), My Fair Lady (1964)*
 Here Comes Mr. Jordan (1941), Heaven Can Wait (1978)
 A Star Is Born (1937), A Star Is Born (2018)
 Little Women (1933), Little Women (2019)
 All Quiet on the Western Front (1929/30)*, All Quiet on the Western Front (2022)
 First Best Picture produced wholly by non-Americans Hamlet (1948), United Kingdom
 First Best Picture produced wholly by non-Americans or non-British The Artist (2011), France
 First Best Picture produced wholly by non-Caucasians Parasite (2019), South Korea
 Most wins by a film produced wholly or partially by non-Americans The Last Emperor (1987), Italy/Hong Kong/United Kingdom, 9 wins
 Most nominations for a film produced wholly or partially by non-Americans Two non-American films have received 13 nominations:
 Shakespeare in Love (1998), United Kingdom/United States
 The Lord of the Rings: The Fellowship of the Ring (2001), New Zealand/United States
 Best Picture with no female speaking roles Lawrence of Arabia (1962)Best Picture winners adapted from Best Play/Musical Tony Award winners My Fair Lady (1964)
 The Sound of Music (1965)
 A Man for All Seasons (1966)
 Amadeus (1984)
Also:
All About Eve (1950) was adapted into the musical Applause, which won the Best Musical in 1970.
Chicago (2002) was adapted from both the original 1975 musical, which was nominated for Best Musical, and the 1996 revival, which won Best Revival.
While the musical Titanic (1997) won Best Musical in 1997 and the film Titanic (1997) won Best Picture in 1998, neither production had anything to do with the other, and by coincidence, both opened in the same year.Best Picture winners based on Pulitzer Prize winning sourcesYou Can't Take It With You – play
Gone with the Wind – novel
All the King's Men – novel
Driving Miss Daisy – play
Spotlight – public service reporting
On the Waterfront was an original screenplay suggested from Pulitzer-winning newspaper articles.Best Picture winners with the highest prize wins from the "Big Three" (Cannes, Venice, and Berlin)The Lost Weekend (1945) – Palme d'Or
Hamlet (1948) – Golden Lion
Marty (1955) – Palme d'Or
Rain Man (1988) – Golden Bear
The Shape of Water (2017) – Golden Lion
Parasite (2019) – Palme d'Or
Nomadland (2020) – Golden LionPalme d'Or winning films to be nominated for Best Picture The Lost Weekend
 Marty
 Friendly Persuasion
 M*A*S*H
 The Conversation
 Taxi Driver
 Apocalypse Now
 All That Jazz
 Missing
 The Mission
 The Piano
 Pulp Fiction
 Secrets & Lies
 The Pianist
 The Tree of Life
 Amour
 Parasite
 Triangle of Sadness
 Golden Lion winning films to be nominated for Best Picture Hamlet
 Atlantic City
 Brokeback Mountain
 The Shape of Water
 Roma
 Joker
 Nomadland
 Golden Bear winning films to be nominated for Best Picture'''
 12 Angry Men
 Rain Man
 In the Name of the Father
 Sense and Sensibility
 The Thin Red LineActing nominations from a single filmNine films have earned a record 5 acting nominations.
Mrs. Miniver
All About Eve
From Here to Eternity
On the Waterfront
Peyton Place 
Tom Jones
Bonnie and Clyde
The Godfather Part II
Network
Most nominations for male actors (4)
On the Waterfront
The Godfather
The Godfather Part II
Most nominations for actresses (4)
All About EveActing wins from a single filmThree films have received 3 acting awards:
A Streetcar Named Desire (1951)
Network (1976)
Everything Everywhere All at Once (2022)

Acting records

 Most awards for leading actress Katharine Hepburn with 4 awards (1933, 1967, 1968, 1981) 
 Most awards for leading actor Daniel Day-Lewis with 3 awards (1989, 2007, 2012)
 Most awards for supporting actor Walter Brennan with 3 awards (1936, 1938, 1940)
 Most awards for supporting actress Shelley Winters (1959, 1965) and Dianne Wiest (1986, 1994) with 2 awards 
 Most consecutive leading actress nominations Two actresses have been nominated 5 years in a row:
 Bette Davis (1938–1942)
 Greer Garson (1941–1945)
 Most consecutive leading actor nominations Marlon Brando with four nominations (1951 to 1954)
 Actor with most total nominations for acting Jack Nicholson with 12 nominations
 Actress with most total nominations for acting Meryl Streep with 21 nominations
 Most nominations for an actor without a win Peter O'Toole with 8 nominations (He received an Honorary Award in 2002)
 Most nominations for an actress without a win Glenn Close with 8 nominations 
 Most nominations for an actor performing in a foreign language Marcello Mastroianni with 3 nominations. He was nominated for Best Actor for Divorce, Italian Style (1962); A Special Day (1977) and Dark Eyes (1987), performing in Italian
 Longest gap between first and second award Helen Hayes won in 1932 for The Sin of Madelon Claudet and in 1970 for Airport, a 38-year gap
 Longest gap between first and second nomination Judd Hirsch was nominated in 1980 for Ordinary People and in 2022 for The Fabelmans, a 42-year gap
 Longest time span between first and last nomination and between first and last award Katharine Hepburn: 48 years from Morning Glory (1933, in the 1932/33 awards) until On Golden Pond (1981)
 Most acting nominations before first award Both Geraldine Page and Al Pacino won on their 8th nomination
 Most posthumous nominations James Dean with 2 (1955 for East of Eden and 1956 for Giant)
 Shortest performance to win an acting Oscar Beatrice Straight in Network (1976) – 5 minutes and 2 seconds
 Shortest performance to win a lead acting Oscar Patricia Neal in Hud (1963) – 21 minutes and 51 seconds
 Shortest performance to be nominated for an acting Oscar Hermione Baddeley in Room at the Top (1959) – 2 minutes and 19 seconds
 Shortest female performance to be nominated for a lead acting Oscar Eleanor Parker in Detective Story (1951) – 20 minutes and 10 seconds
 Shortest male performance to be nominated for a lead acting Oscar Spencer Tracy in San Francisco (1936) – 14 minutes and 58 seconds
 Shortest male performance to win a lead acting Oscar David Niven in Separate Tables (1958) – 23 minutes and 39 seconds
 Shortest male performance to be nominated for a supporting acting Oscar Ned Beatty in Network (1976) – 6 minutes
 Shortest male performance to win a supporting acting Oscar Ben Johnson in The Last Picture Show (1971) – 9 minutes and 54 seconds
 Longest performance to win and be nominated for an acting Oscar Vivien Leigh in Gone with the Wind (1939) – 2 hours, 23 minutes and 32 seconds
 Longest performance to win a supporting acting Oscar Tatum O'Neal in Paper Moon (1973) – 1 hour, 6 minutes and 58 seconds
 Longest male performance to win an acting Oscar Charlton Heston in Ben-Hur (1959) – 2 hours, 1 minute and 23 seconds
 Longest male performance to be nominated for an acting Oscar Denzel Washington in Malcolm X (1992) – 2 hours, 21 minutes and 58 seconds
 Longest male performance to win a supporting acting Oscar Mahershala Ali in Green Book (2018) – 1 hour, 6 minutes and 38 seconds
 Longest male performance to be nominated for a supporting acting Oscar Frank Finlay in Othello (1965) – 1 hour, 30 minutes and 43 seconds
 Longest female performance to be nominated for a supporting acting Oscar Jennifer Jones in Since You Went Away (1944) – 1 hour, 15 minutes and 38 seconds
 Most awards by an African American actor Two African-American actors have won two Oscars:
 Denzel Washington, winning Best Supporting Actor for Glory (1989) and Best Actor for Training Day (2001)
 Mahershala Ali winning Best Supporting Actor for Moonlight (2016) and for Green Book (2018)
 Most awards for one acting performance Harold Russell played Homer Parish in The Best Years of Our Lives in 1946. For this role he received 2 Oscars, one for Best Supporting Actor and an honorary award for being an inspiration to all returning veterans
 Most nominations for one acting performance Barry Fitzgerald was nominated as Best Actor and won for Best Supporting Actor for his role as Father Fitzgibbon in 1944's Going My Way
 Only performer to win portraying multiple characters in the same film Lee Marvin won for playing Kid Shelleen and Tim Strawn in Cat Ballou
 Most separate roles played in a single movie to be nominated for an Oscar Peter Sellers was nominated for Best Actor for playing 3 people (Lionel Mandrake, President Merkin Muffley and Dr. Strangelove) in Dr. Strangelove (1964)
 Years where all four Acting winners were born outside the United States 1964
 Best Actor – Rex Harrison for My Fair Lady, United Kingdom
 Best Actress – Julie Andrews for Mary Poppins, United Kingdom
 Best Supporting Actor – Peter Ustinov for Topkapi, United Kingdom
 Best Supporting Actress – Lila Kedrova for Zorba the Greek, Russia
 2007
 Best Actor – Daniel Day-Lewis for There Will Be Blood, United Kingdom
 Best Actress – Marion Cotillard for La Vie en Rose, France
 Best Supporting Actor – Javier Bardem for No Country for Old Men, Spain
 Best Supporting Actress – Tilda Swinton for Michael Clayton, United Kingdom
 Acting winners who won a Tony Award for portraying the same character Anne Bancroft – Anne Sullivan
 Helen Mirren – Queen Elizabeth II (Won Tony Award for 2015 play The Audience)
 Jack Albertson – John Cleary 
 Joel Grey – Master of Ceremonies 
 José Ferrer – Cyrano de Bergerac 
 Lila Kedrova – Madame Hortense (Won Tony Award for 1984 musical Zorba)
 Paul Scofield – Sir Thomas More
 Rex Harrison – Henry Higgins
 Shirley Booth – Lola Delaney 
 Viola Davis – Rose Maxson
 Yul Brynner – King Mongkut of Siam
 Acting awards in Science Fiction, Fantasy, Superhero, and Horror genresFredric March, 1931, Dr. Jekyll and Mr. Hyde
Edmund Gwenn, 1947, Miracle on 34th Street
Julie Andrews, 1964, Mary Poppins
Ruth Gordon, 1968, Rosemary's Baby
Cliff Robertson, 1968, Charly
Don Ameche, 1985, Cocoon
Jodie Foster, 1991, The Silence of the Lambs
Anthony Hopkins, 1991, The Silence of the Lambs
Heath Ledger, 2008, The Dark Knight
Joaquin Phoenix, 2019, Joker
Jamie Lee Curtis, 2022, Everything Everywhere All at Once
Ke Huy Quan, 2022, Everything Everywhere All at Once
Michelle Yeoh, 2022, Everything Everywhere All at Once

Miscellaneous records
 Most nominations in different decades John Williams:
 1960s: 1968
 1970s: 1970 (2 nominations), 1972, 1973 (2 nominations), 1974 (3 nominations), 1975, 1976, 1978 (2 nominations), 1979
 1980s: 1981, 1982, 1983 (2 nominations), 1984, 1985 (2 nominations), 1988 (2 nominations), 1989
 1990s: 1990 (2 nominations), 1991 (2 nominations), 1992 (2 nominations), 1994, 1996 (3 nominations), 1997, 1998, 1999
 2000s: 2000, 2001, 2002 (2 nominations), 2003, 2005, 2006 (2 nominations)
 2010s: 2012 (2 nominations), 2013, 2014, 2016, 2018
 2020s: 2020, 2022
 Only people to win both a Nobel Prize and an Oscar George Bernard Shaw: Won the Nobel Prize in Literature in 1925, and an Oscar for Best Adapted Screenplay for the film Pygmalion in 1938
 Bob Dylan: Won an Oscar for Best Original Song for the song "Things Have Changed" from Wonder Boys in 2000, and the Nobel Prize in Literature in 2016
 Only person to win both a Booker Prize and an OscarRuth Prawer Jhabvala: Won the Booker Prize for Heat and Dust in 1975, and two Oscars for Best Adapted Screenplay for the films A Room with a View in 1986 and Howards End in 1992
 People who won both a Pulitzer Prize and an OscarAaron Copland: Won an Oscar for Best Original Score for the film The Heiress in 1949, and the Pulitzer Prize for Music in 1945
John Corigliano: Won an Oscar for Best Original Score for the film The Red Violin in 1999, and the Pulitzer Prize for Music in 2001
Bob Dylan: Won an Oscar for Best Original Song for the song "Things Have Changed" from Wonder Boys in 2000, and an additional citation in the Pulitzer Prize for Music in 2006
Horton Foote: Won two Oscars; Best Adapted Screenplay for the film To Kill a Mockingbird in 1962, and Best Original Screenplay for the film Tender Mercies in 1983, and the Pulitzer Prize for Drama in 1995
Marvin Hamlisch: Won three Oscars in 1973; Best Score-Adaptation or Treatment for the film The Sting, and Best Original Score and Best Original Song for the title song of the film The Way We Were, and the Pulitzer Prize for Drama in 1976
Oscar Hammerstein II: Won two Oscars; Best Original Song for the songs "The Last Time I Saw Paris" from the film Lady Be Good in 1941, and "It Might as Well Be Spring" for the film from the film State Fair in 1945, and the Pulitzer Prize for Drama in 1950, along with an additional citation in 1943
Sidney Howard: Posthumously won an Oscar for Best Adapted Screenplay for the film Gone With the Wind in 1939, and the Pulitzer Prize for Drama in 1925
William Inge: Won an Oscar for Best Original Screenplay for the film Splendor in the Grass in 1961, and the Pulitzer Prize for Drama in 1953
Frank Loesser: Won an Oscar for Best Original Song for the song "Baby, It's Cold Outside" from the film Neptune's Daughter in 1949, and the Pulitzer Prize for Drama in 1962
Richard Rodgers: Won an Oscar for Best Original Song for the song "It Might as Well Be Spring" from the film State Fair in 1945, and the Pulitzer Prize for Drama in 1950, along with an additional citation in 1943
William Saroyan: Won an Oscar for Best Story, Screenplay for the film The Human Comedy in 1943, and the Pulitzer Prize for Drama in 1940
John Patrick Shanley: Won an Oscar for Best Original Screenplay for the film Moonstruck in 1987, and the Pulitzer Prize for Drama in 2005
Robert E. Sherwood: Won an Oscar for Best Adapted Screenplay for the film The Best Years of Our Lives in 1946, and the Pulitzer Prize for Drama in 1936, 1938, and 1941, and the Pulitzer Prize for Biography or Autobiography in 1949
Stephen Sondheim: Won an Oscar for Best Original Song for the song "Sooner or Later (I Always Get My Man)" from the film Dick Tracy in 1990, and the Pulitzer Prize for Drama in 1985
Alfred Uhry: Won an Oscar for Best Adapted Screenplay for the film Driving Miss Daisy in 1989, and the Pulitzer Prize for Drama for the stage version in 1988
 Only person to win both an Olympic medal and an Oscar Kobe Bryant: Won gold medals in Basketball in 2008 and 2012, and an Oscar for Best Animated Short Film in 2017 for the film Dear Basketball
 Only person to win for Acting and Songwriting Barbra Streisand: Best Actress for Funny Girl (1968); Best Original Song for the Love Theme ("Evergreen") from A Star Is Born (1976)
 Only person to win for Acting and Writing Emma Thompson: Best Actress for Howards End (1992); Best Adapted Screenplay for Sense and Sensibility (1995)
 Only person to win for Acting and Directing To date, technically no one has. However Lee Grant won for Best Supporting Actress for Shampoo (1975) and she directed the Best Documentary Feature, Down and Out in America (1986), but under the Academy rules at the time, only producers were eligible to win the award, so the award went to her producer husband and another co-producer. Under the present rules, the director would now be recognized with the Oscar
 Only person nominated for Acting, Writing, Producing, and Directing for the same film Warren Beatty was nominated in the four categories for Heaven Can Wait (1978), and again for Reds (1981)
 Citizen Kane was nominated in the four categories, but at the time, the studio rather than the individual producer was eligible for the Best Picture award, meaning that writer/director/producer/actor Orson Welles was not nominated as a producer.
 Only actor to win an Oscar for portraying a real Oscar winnerCate Blanchett won Best Supporting Actress for portraying Katharine Hepburn in The Aviator
Additionally, Renée Zellweger won Best Actress for portraying Judy Garland in Judy. Garland received the Academy Juvenile Award, an honorary award, but never won a competitive Oscar 
 Only actor to win an Oscar for portraying a fictional Oscar nominee Maggie Smith won Best Supporting Actress for California Suite
 Only actor to appear in two movies with 11 Oscar wins Bernard Hill in Titanic and Lord of The Rings: Return of The King
 Most total nominations without a win Greg P. Russell has earned 16 nominations in the Best Sound Mixing category (This does not include his nomination at the 89th Academy Awards for 13 Hours: The Secret Soldiers of Benghazi, which was revoked the day before the ceremony.)
 Most total nominations before receiving an award Film composer Victor Young was nominated 21 times without winning. He was often nominated multiple times in one year; twice, four times at the same Oscars. He won posthumously for Around the World in 80 Days, alongside yet another nomination (also posthumous)
Sound re-recording mixer Kevin O'Connell comes in at a close second, with 20 unsuccessful nominations from 1983 until 2016, when he finally won for Hacksaw Ridge.
 Most nominations for a living person Film composer John Williams with 53
 Only write-in nominee to win a competitive award Cinematographer Hal Mohr for A Midsummer Night's Dream (1935)
 Only person to receive every nomination in a single category Animation producer Stephen Bosustow in 1957 for Best Short Subject – CartoonsMost distinct categories to have been nominated inKenneth Branagh: eight nominations in seven categories, winning once
Best Picture
Best Director
Best Original Screenplay
Best Adapted Screenplay
Best Actor
Best Supporting Actor 
Best Live Action Short Film
Alfonso Cuarón: eleven nominations in seven categories, winning four
Best Picture
Best Director
Best Original Screenplay
Best Adapted Screenplay
Best Film Editing
Best Cinematography
Best Live Action Short Film
NOTE: His film Roma also won the Academy Award for Best International Feature Film but as it’s awarded to the country rather than the producer or director, this does not count towards his wins and nominations.Most nominated woman Costume designer Edith Head with 35
 Highest "perfect score" Sound editor Mark Berger has four nominations and four wins
 Most nominations for directing William Wyler with 12 nominations
 Most nominations for directing without an award All received 5 nominations
 Robert Altman
 Clarence Brown
 Alfred Hitchcock
 King Vidor
 Most wins for producing Two producers received 3 awards:
 Sam Spiegel
 Saul Zaentz
 Most nominations for producing Steven Spielberg with 12 nominations
 Most nominations for directing in a single year Two people have received 2 nominations for Best Director in the same year:
 Michael Curtiz for Angels with Dirty Faces and Four Daughters in 1938
 Steven Soderbergh for Erin Brockovich and Traffic in 2000
 Most Best Picture awards for a film series The Godfather series with 2 (for The Godfather and The Godfather Part II)
 Other Best Picture awards for a film series Rocky series: Rocky (1976)
 The Middle-earth series: The Lord of the Rings: The Return of the King (2003)
 Film series with multiple Best Picture nominations The Godfather series with 3 nominations (for The Godfather, The Godfather Part II, and The Godfather Part III)
 The Middle-earth series with 3 nominations (for The Lord of the Rings: The Fellowship of the Ring, The Lord of the Rings: The Two Towers, and The Lord of the Rings: The Return of the King)
 Avatar series with 2 nominations (for Avatar and Avatar: The Way of Water)
 Most nominations for a film seriesStar Wars with 38 nominations 
 Most awards for a film series The Middle-earth series with 17 competitive wins out of 37 nominations (for The Lord of the Rings and The Hobbit)
 Most nominations for Best Original Screenplay Woody Allen with 16 nominations and 3 wins
 Longest time between the release of a film and winning an Oscar Limelight (1952) is the only film to have won an award twenty years after its official release. Since it was not released in Los Angeles County until 1972, it was not eligible for any Academy Awards until that time
 Most posthumous award wins William A. Horning won in 1958 for Best Art Direction for Gigi, and for Best Art Direction for Ben-Hur in 1959
 Most posthumous award nominations Howard Ashman with fourHighest-grossing film to win Best PictureTitanic with $2,187,535,296Highest-grossing film to be nominated for Best PictureAvatar with $2,847,397,339Films to gross over $2 billion to be nominated for Best PictureAvatar
Avatar: The Way of Water
TitanicFilms to gross over $1 billion to be nominated for Best PictureAvatar
Avatar: The Way of Water
Black Panther
Joker
The Lord of the Rings: The Return of the King
Titanic
Top Gun: Maverick
Toy Story 3Highest-grossing R-rated film to win Best PictureGladiator with $457,552,323Highest-grossing R-rated film to be nominated for Best PictureJoker with $1,074,251,311Lowest-grossing film to win Best PictureCODA with $1,052,792
 Longest film to win Best Picture Gone with the Wind, 224 minutes (238 with overture, entr'acte, and exit music)
 Longest film to win an award O.J.: Made in America (2016), 467 minutes (Best Documentary Feature)
 The longest fictional film to win an award was War and Peace (1968), 431 minutes (Best Foreign Language Film)
 Shortest film to win Best Picture Marty, 90 minutes
 Shortest film to win an award The Crunch Bird, 2 minutes (Best Animated Short Film)
 Most acting awards for a character Portrayals of Vito Corleone won:
 Best Actor for Marlon Brando in The Godfather
 Best Supporting Actor for Robert De Niro in The Godfather Part II
 Portrayals of the Joker won:
 Best Supporting Actor for Heath Ledger in The Dark Knight
 Best Actor for Joaquin Phoenix in Joker
 Portrayals of Anita from West Side Story won:
 Best Supporting Actress for Rita Moreno in the 1961 film adaptation
 Best Supporting Actress for Ariana DeBose in the 2021 film adaptation
 Most nominations for a character Three portrayals of Queen Elizabeth I of England earned nominations for:
 Cate Blanchett in Elizabeth and Elizabeth: The Golden Age (Best Actress)
 Judi Dench in Shakespeare in Love (winner, Best Supporting Actress)
 Three portrayals of King Henry VIII of England earned nominations for:
 Charles Laughton in The Private Life of Henry VIII (winner, Best Actor)
 Robert Shaw in A Man for All Seasons (Best Supporting Actor)
 Richard Burton in Anne of the Thousand Days (Best Actor)
The lead characters of three different versions of A Star Is Born have been nominated:
Female leads: 
1937 : Janet Gaynor as actress Esther Blodgett/Vicki Lester
1954 : Judy Garland as actress/singer Esther Blodgett/Vicki Lester
2018 : Lady Gaga as singer/musician Ally Campana
Male leads:
1937 : Fredric March as actor Norman Maine
1954 : James Mason as actor Norman Maine 
2018 : Bradley Cooper as singer/musician Jackson Maine
 26 other characters have been nominated twice (* = winning portrayal):
Abraham Lincoln: Raymond Massey, Daniel Day-Lewis*
 Anita from West Side Story: Rita Moreno*, Ariana DeBose*
 Arthur Chipping from Goodbye, Mr. Chips: Robert Donat*, Peter O'Toole
 Billie Holiday: Diana Ross, Andra Day
Cyrano de Bergerac: Jose Ferrer*, Gerard Depardieu
 "Fast Eddie" Felson: Paul Newman*; Newman played Felson in The Hustler and its sequel, The Color of Money, winning for the sequel.
 Father Chuck O'Malley: Bing Crosby*; Crosby played O’Malley in Going My Way and The Bells of St. Mary's, winning for Going My Way.
 Father Fitzgibbons: Barry Fitzgerald*: nominated for Best Actor and won for Best Supporting Actor, for the same performance in Going My Way
 Henry Higgins: Leslie Howard (from Pygmalion), Rex Harrison (from My Fair Lady)*
Howard Hughes: Jason Robards, Leonardo DiCaprio
Iris Murdoch: Judi Dench, Kate Winslet: portrayals of the same character at different ages in the same film (Iris)
 Jo March (from Little Women): Winona Ryder, Saoirse Ronan
 Joe Pendleton: Robert Montgomery (from Here Comes Mr. Jordan), Warren Beatty (from Heaven Can Wait)
The Joker: Heath Ledger*, Joaquin Phoenix*
King Henry II of England: Peter O'Toole (Becket, The Lion in Winter)
King Henry V of England: Laurence Olivier, Kenneth Branagh
Leda Caruso: Olivia Colman, Jessie Buckley: portrayals of the same character at different ages in the same film (The Lost Daughter)
 Leslie Crosbie (from The Letter): Jeanne Eagels, Bette Davis
 Marilyn Monroe: Michelle Williams (from My Week with Marilyn), Ana de Armas (from Blonde)
 Max Corkle: James Gleason (from Here Comes Mr. Jordan), Jack Warden (from Heaven Can Wait)
Michael Corleone: Al Pacino
Richard Nixon: Anthony Hopkins, Frank Langella
Rocky Balboa: Sylvester Stallone
Rooster Cogburn: John Wayne*, Jeff Bridges
 Rose DeWitt Bukater: Kate Winslet, Gloria Stuart: portrayals of the same character at different ages in the same film (Titanic)
Vincent van Gogh: Kirk Douglas, Willem Dafoe
Vito Corleone: Marlon Brando*, Robert De Niro*Most royalty and leaders portrayed 49 portrayals of monarchs or civil leaders (real and fictional), have been nominated for acting awards, with 11 winners
 The United Kingdom is the most represented nation
 Overall, there have been 16 nominations and 5 wins for portrayals of British monarchs
 In addition, two portrayals of Scottish monarchs have been nominated
 Three portrayals of British Prime Ministers have been nominated, with 3 wins
 Portrayals of four French kings and Emperor Napoleon have received nominations
 The only portrayal of a non-British monarch to win an award was Yul Brynner as King Mongkut of Siam in The King and I 
 11 portrayals of presidents of the United States – three of them fictional – have been nominated, with Daniel Day-Lewis's portrayal of Abraham Lincoln in Lincoln the only winner
 Two portrayals of popes (the head of state for Vatican City) have been nominated, both from the film The Two Popes
 12 portrayals of spouses/consorts of leaders have been nominated, with Katharine Hepburn's Eleanor of Aquitaine in The Lion in Winter the only winner
 Three portrayals of dictators have been nominated:
 Forest Whitaker won for his portrayal of Idi Amin in The Last King of Scotland
Charlie Chaplin and Jack Oakie were nominated for their respective turns as the dictators of Tomainia and Bacteria in The Great DictatorMost Honorary AwardsBob Hope received 5 honorary awards – 2 Special, 2 Honorary, and the Jean Hersholt Humanitarian AwardTallest Oscar winner/nomineeFlorian Henckel von Donnersmarck (2.05m/6 ft 9in) – Best International Feature Film (The Lives of Others)Shortest Oscar winnerLinda Hunt (1.45m/4 ft 9in) – Best Supporting Actress (The Year of Living Dangerously)Shortest Oscar nomineeMichael Dunn (1.17m/3 ft 10in) – Best Supporting Actor (Ship of Fools)

Oscar speeches

 Longest speech The longest Oscar speech was that given by Greer Garson at the 15th Academy Awards after she was named Best Actress for 1942 for Mrs. Miniver. The exact length of her speech is unknown but it is believed that it ran for nearly six minutes. It was shortly after this incident that the academy set forty-five seconds as the allotted time for an acceptance speech and began to cut the winners off after this time limit. When presenting the Best Actor award at the 24th Academy Awards, Garson quipped, "I think I have ten minutes left over from a highly emotional speech I made a few years ago. I'd be glad to give it to them."
 Shortest speech'''
 The shortest Oscar speech was that given by Patty Duke at the 35th Academy Awards after she was named Best Supporting Actress for 1962 for The Miracle Worker. Duke, age 16, was the youngest person at that time to receive an Academy Award in a competitive category. Her acceptance speech was, simply, two words  "Thank you"  after which she walked off the stage (Note: When Fred Zinnemann accepted the Best Picture Oscar for A Man For All Seasons, he simply nodded and smiled. However, minutes earlier he had won Best Director and made his thank-yous then, and thus felt he had nothing to add.)

Tied winners

There have been six two-way ties:
1931/32: Best Actor – Wallace Beery (The Champ) and Fredric March (Dr. Jekyll and Mr. Hyde)
1949: Best Documentary Short – A Chance to Live and So Much for So Little1968: Best Actress – Katharine Hepburn (The Lion in Winter) and Barbra Streisand (Funny Girl)
1986: Best Documentary – Artie Shaw: Time Is All You've Got and Down and Out in America1994: Best Short Film (Live Action) – Franz Kafka's It's a Wonderful Life and Trevor2012: Best Sound Editing – Paul N. J. Ottosson (Zero Dark Thirty) and Per Hallberg and Karen Baker Landers (Skyfall)

Clean sweep
The following films with at least two nominations won all of their categories.
 1927/1928: Wings (2)
 Outstanding Picture: Paramount Pictures
 Best Engineering Effects: Roy Pomeroy
 1934: It Happened One Night (5)
 Outstanding Production: Frank Capra and Harry Cohn
 Best Director: Frank Capra
 Best Actor: Clark Gable
 Best Actress: Claudette Colbert
 Best Adaptation: Robert Riskin
 1940: Pinocchio (2)
 Best Original Score: Leigh Harline, Paul Smith and Ned Washington
 Best Song: Leigh Harline and Ned Washington ("When You Wish Upon a Star")
 1947: Black Narcissus (2)
 Best Cinematography (Color): Jack Cardiff
 Best Art Direction (Color): Alfred Junge (Art Direction and Set Decoration)
 1958: Gigi (9)
 Best Motion Picture: Arthur Freed
 Best Director: Vincente Minnelli
 Best Screenplay Based on Material from Another Medium: Alan Jay Lerner
 Best Cinematography (Color): Joseph Ruttenberg
 Best Costume Design: Cecil Beaton
 Best Film Editing: Adrienne Fazan
 Best Scoring of a Musical Picture: André Previn
 Best Song: Frederick Loewe and Alan Jay Lerner ("Gigi")
 Best Art Direction: William A. Horning and E. Preston Ames (Art Direction) / Henry Grace and F. Keogh Gleason (Set Decoration)
 1966: Born Free (2)
 Best Original Music Score: John Barry
 Best Song: John Barry and Don Black ("Born Free")
 1966: Grand Prix (3)
 Best Film Editing: Fredric Steinkamp, Henry Berman, Stu Linder and Frank Santillo
 Best Sound Effects: Gordon Daniel
 Best Sound: Franklin Milton
 1971: Sentinels of Silence (2)
 Best Documentary Short Subject: Robert Amram and Manuel Arango
 Best Live Action Short Subject: Robert Amram and Manuel Arango
 1974: The Great Gatsby (2)
 Best Costume Design: Theoni V. Aldredge
 Best Scoring: Original Song Score and Adaptation or Scoring: Adaptation: Nelson Riddle
 1985: Cocoon (2)
 Best Supporting Actor: Don Ameche
 Best Visual Effects: Ken Ralston, Ralph McQuarrie, Scott Farrar and David Berry
 1987: The Last Emperor (9)
 Best Picture: Jeremy Thomas
 Best Director: Bernardo Bertolucci
 Best Screenplay Based on Material from Another Medium: Bernardo Bertolucci and Mark Peploe
 Best Cinematography: Vittorio Storaro
 Best Costume Design: James Acheson
 Best Film Editing: Gabriella Cristiani
 Best Original Score: Ryuichi Sakamoto, David Byrne and Cong Su
 Best Art Direction: Ferdinando Scarfiotti (Art Direction) / Bruno Cesari and Osvaldo Desideri (Set Decoration)
 Best Sound: Bill Rowe and Ivan Sharrock
 1989: The Little Mermaid (2)
 Best Original Score: Alan Menken
 Best Original Song: Alan Menken and Howard Ashman ("Under the Sea")
 1993: Jurassic Park (3)
 Best Sound Effects Editing: Gary Rydstrom and Richard Hymns
 Best Sound: Gary Rydstrom, Gary Summers, Ron Judkins and Shawn Murphy
 Best Visual Effects: Dennis Muren, Stan Winston, Phil Tippett and Michael Lantieri
 1994: Ed Wood (2)
 Best Supporting Actor: Martin Landau
 Best Makeup: Rick Baker, Ve Neill and Yolanda Toussieng
 1994: The Lion King (2)
 Best Original Score: Hans Zimmer
 Best Original Song: Elton John and Tim Rice ("Can You Feel the Love Tonight")
 1995: Pocahontas (2)
 Best Original Musical or Comedy Score: Alan Menken and Stephen Schwartz
 Best Original Song: Alan Menken and Stephen Schwartz ("Colors of the Wind")
 1995: Restoration (2)
 Best Costume Design: James Acheson
 Best Art Direction: Eugenio Zanetti (Art Direction and Set Decoration)
 1995: The Usual Suspects (2)
 Best Supporting Actor: Kevin Spacey
 Best Screenplay Written Directly for the Screen: Christopher McQuarrie
 1999: The Matrix (4)
 Best Film Editing: Zach Staenberg
 Best Sound Effects Editing: Dane Davis
 Best Sound: John T. Reitz, Gregg Rudloff, David E. Campbell and David Lee
 Best Visual Effects: John Gaeta, Janek Sirrs, Steve Courtley and Jon Thum
 2003: The Lord of the Rings: The Return of the King (11)
 Best Picture: Peter Jackson, Fran Walsh and Barrie M. Osborne
 Best Director: Peter Jackson
 Best Adapted Screenplay: Fran Walsh, Peter Jackson and Philippa Boyens
 Best Costume Design: Ngila Dickson and Richard Taylor
 Best Film Editing: Jamie Selkirk
 Best Makeup: Peter King and Richard Taylor
 Best Original Score: Howard Shore
 Best Original Song: Howard Shore, Fran Walsh and Annie Lennox ("Into the West")
 Best Art Direction: Grant Major (Art Direction) / Dan Hennah and Alan Lee (Set Decoration)
 Best Sound Mixing: Christopher Boyes, Hammond Peek, Michael Hedges and Michael Semanick
 Best Visual Effects: Jim Rygiel, Joe Letteri, Randall William Cook and Alex Funke
 2006: An Inconvenient Truth (2)
 Best Documentary Feature Film: Davis Guggenheim
 Best Original Song: Melissa Etheridge ("I Need to Wake Up")
 2007: The Bourne Ultimatum (3)
 Best Film Editing: Christopher Rouse
 Best Sound Editing: Karen Baker Landers and Per Hallberg
 Best Sound Mixing: Scott Millan, Kirk Francis and David Parker
 2011: The Iron Lady (2)
 Best Actress: Meryl Streep
 Best Makeup: Mark Coulier and J. Roy Helland
 2013: Frozen (2)
 Best Animated Feature Film: Chris Buck, Jennifer Lee and Peter Del Vecho
 Best Original Song: Kristen Anderson-Lopez and Robert Lopez ("Let It Go")
 2013: The Great Gatsby (2)
 Best Costume Design: Catherine Martin
 Best Production Design: Catherine Martin (Production Design) / Beverley Dunn (Set Decoration)
 2017: Coco (2)
 Best Animated Feature Film: Lee Unkrich and Darla K. Anderson
 Best Original Song: Kristen Anderson-Lopez and Robert Lopez ("Remember Me")
 2021: CODA (3)
 Best Picture: Fabrice Gianfermi, Philippe Rousselet and Patrick Wachsberger
 Best Supporting Actor: Troy Kotsur
 Best Adapted Screenplay: Sian Heder
 2021: The Eyes of Tammy Faye'' (2)
 Best Actress : Jessica Chastain
 Best Makeup and Hairstyling : Linda Dowds, Stephanie Ingram and Justin Raleigh

See also

References

External links
 Oscars.org (official Academy site)
 The Academy Awards Database (official site)
 Filmsite.org

Records
Film-related lists of superlatives